Cape North may refer to:

Places

 Headlands
 Cape North (Nova Scotia), Canada, and a small unincorporated area of the same name
 Cape North (South Georgia),
 Cape North (Victoria Land), Antarctica
 Cape Schmidt, Siberia, Russia

See also
North Cape (disambiguation)